Tapee College is a private college in the city of Surat Thani, Surat Thani Province, Thailand. The college was established in 1999 and named after the major river of the province.

The college has five faculties:
 Faculty of Science and Technology
 Faculty of Business Administration
 Faculty of Accountancy
 Faculty of Law
 Faculty of Liberal Arts

See also
 List of universities in Thailand

External links 
  (Thai)

Colleges in Thailand
Buildings and structures in Surat Thani province
Buildings and structures in Surat Thani
Educational institutions established in 1999
1999 establishments in Thailand